The Algeria national athletics team represents Algeria at the international athletics competitions such as Olympic Games or World Athletics Championships.

Medal count
Algeria has 13 participations in the Summer Olympic of 27 editions held from 1896 to 2016.

List of medalists at Olympic Games

List of medalists

List of medalists at World Championships

List of medalists at World Indoor Championships

See also
Athletics Algeria
Algeria at the Olympics
List of Algerian records in athletics
Athletics Summer Olympics medal table
World Championships medal table

References

External links
Athletics at Summer Olympics

National team
Athletics
Algeria